The Manipur bush rat (Hadromys humei), also known as Hume's rat or Hume's hadromys, is a species of rodent in the family Muridae. It is found in northeastern India, and is listed as endangered.

Range and habitat
The species is endemic to northeast India, and has been recorded from several localities. These are: Angarakhata in Kamrup district (Assam), Bishnupur, Imphal, Senapati and Karong (specimen FMNH 76562) in Manipur.

Originally thought to occur in Yunnan in China also, the Chinese animals have been reclassified as Hadromys yunnanensis Yang & Wang 1987. The fossil record shows that populations of the Manipur Bush Rat existed all over Thailand right down to the Thai-Malay border during the Pleistocene. During that time, the Indo-Malayan region may have had a cooler and drier climate with savanna-like regions. A related species is known from the Siwalik fossils from northern Pakistan. These findings indicate that Hadromys humei is probably a "relict" species.

It inhabits tropical evergreen, moist deciduous and evergreen forests and also found in secondary forests in northeastern India.

Discovery
The murid was described by Oldfield Thomas in 1886 from specimens in the Manipur collection of Allan Octavian Hume, which was donated to the British Museum (Natural History) after Hume's life's work in ornithological notes were sold by a servant as waste paper. The Manipur Bush Rat was named in his honour. The collection has two male and two female specimens, recorded to be collected on 23 March 1881 from "Moirang" (in Manipur), the type locality for this species.

Description
The specimen has been described by Thomas (1886) as:

Conservation status
The species has been given conservation status of "Endangered - B1ab(iii)+2ab(iii)" in IUCN Red List ver 3.1. The criteria for this assessment include:
 Limited area of occurrence (less than ).
 Limited geographical extent of range (less than ).
 Less than five areas from which it is reported.
 Continuing decline in extent and degradation of habitat.

The principal threats to this species are assessed to be loss of and degradation of habitat, fragmentation, and encroachment. Besides these, hunting and fire are also considered to be contributing causes.

References

Rats of Asia
Hadromys
Endemic fauna of India
Rodents of India
Environment of Manipur
Endangered fauna of Asia
Mammals described in 1886
Taxa named by Oldfield Thomas
Taxonomy articles created by Polbot